Holiday Home Camp is an overnight children's camp on Geneva Lake in Williams Bay, Wisconsin.  It is a non-profit organization which provides an outdoor experience for low-income youth from the surrounding areas, including Milwaukee, Madison, and Chicago. The program consists of eight day sessions for children ages seven through thirteen. There is also a year-round leadership program, called the ELITE Teens, that is for teens ages thirteen through eighteen.  Holiday Home Camp has been accredited by the American Camp Association.

Holiday Home Camp is one of the oldest camps in the United States. It was founded in 1887 by the Lake Geneva Fresh Air Association. The first campers arrived in July 1888.

References 
 Ottertooth.com U.S. Oldest Camps
 Steele, L. (June 5, 2004). Program helps kids get next to nature.  Milwaukee Journal-Sentinel.  Retrieved February 27, 2008 from http://www.jsonline.com/story/index.aspx?id=234722

Specific

External links 
Holiday Home Camp website
Holiday Home Camp Alumni Association website

Summer camps in Wisconsin
Buildings and structures in Walworth County, Wisconsin
Education in Walworth County, Wisconsin
Youth organizations based in Wisconsin